Kozjak (sometimes Kozjek) is a former village in eastern Slovenia in the Municipality of Trebnje. It is now part of the village of Dolenje Selce. It is part of the traditional region of Lower Carniola and is now included in the Southeast Slovenia Statistical Region.

Geography
Kozjak is located southwest of the village center of Dolenje Selce. It is connected by road to Gorenje Kamenje pri Dobrniču. Kozjek Hill rises northwest of the settlement.

Name
The name Kozjak appears in several locations in Slovenia. It is derived from the common noun koza 'goat', but the motivation is unclear; it may refer to goats that grazed in the area, or the resemblance of a local topographical feature to a goat's back.

History
On the summit of Kozjek Hill there are the ruins of a castle; it was mentioned in written documents in 1274 and it still stood in the 17th century, when it was acquired by the Auersperg family. The Counts of Saurer, who shielded Protestants during the Reformation, were among the earlier owners of the castle. Josip Jurčič's 1864 story Jurij Kozjak, slovenski janičar (Jurij Kozjak, a Slovene Janissary) is connected with the location.

Kozjak was annexed by Dolenje Selce in 1955, ending its existence as a separate settlement.

References

External links
Kozjak on Geopedia

Populated places in the Municipality of Trebnje
Former settlements in Slovenia